Richard Gadd (born 11 May 1990 in Wormit, Fife) is a Scottish writer, actor and comedian.

His most recent show Baby Reindeer premiered at the Edinburgh Festival Fringe 2019 where it won two awards – the Scotsman Fringe First Award for New Writing and a Stage Award for Acting Excellence. The show then went onto a five-week run at The Bush Theatre in London where it won an Off West End Theatre Award for Best Video Design, as well as receiving a nomination in the Best Performer category. The show later transferred to the Ambassador’s Theatre in London’s West End, but was cancelled due to the Coronavirus Pandemic. A few months later, the show went on to win a prestigious Olivier Award for Outstanding Achievement in Affiliate Theatre.

His previous show Monkey See Monkey Do won the Edinburgh Comedy Award for Best Comedy Show at the 2016 Edinburgh Festival Fringe where it was also nominated for a Total Theatre Award for Innovation. Later that year, he won a Chortle Comedian's Comedian Award and was nominated for an Off West End Theatre Award for Best Performer. The show was subsequently broadcast on Comedy Central and had several sell-out runs at London's Soho Theatre, toured the UK and Europe, and had a run at the Melbourne International Comedy Festival, where it was nominated for the 2017 Barry Award.

His previous shows Waiting for Gaddot, Breaking Gadd and Cheese & Crack Whores all debuted at the Edinburgh Festival Fringe  and went on to three-week runs or more at Soho Theatre. The former won an Amused Moose Comedy Award in 2015 as well as a Scottish Comedy Award for Best Solo Show in 2016. It was also nominated for a Malcolm Hardee Award for Innovation and a Chortle Award for Innovation.

He is also an actor, starring opposite Daniel Mays in the BAFTA-nominated BBC2 single drama Against the Law. Other key acting credits include lead roles in BBC3's Clique, Sky Arts’ One Normal Night, Sky One's Code 404 and E4's Tripped.

He is also a screenwriter who has written an episode of Netflix's Sex Education, as well as working across Season Two. He has also written episodes of Ultimate Worrier for Dave and The Last Leg for Channel 4 where he is also one of their correspondents. He has had several written projects broadcast on BBC Radio 4 and BBC Radio Scotland.

References

External links

Richard Gadd on Instagram
Richard Gadd on Facebook

1989 births
Living people
21st-century Scottish male actors
Scottish comedians
Scottish stand-up comedians
People from Wormit
Scottish male television actors
People educated at Madras College